The 2011 Channel One Cup was played between 15–18 December 2011, during the 2011 European Trophy playoffs. The Czech Republic, Finland, Sweden and Russia played a round-robin for a total of three games per team and six games in total. Five of the matches were played in the Megasport Arena in Moscow, Russia, and one match in the ČEZ Stadion Chomutov in Chomutov, Czech Republic. Sweden won the tournament, which was part of 2011–12 Euro Hockey Tour.

Standings

Games
All times are local (UTC+4 for the games in Russia, and UTC+1 for the game in the Czech Republic).

Scoring leaders
GP = Games played; G = Goals; A = Assists; Pts = Points; +/− = Plus/minus; PIM = Penalties in minutes; POS = PositionSource:

Goaltending leaders
TOI = Time on ice (minutes:seconds); SA = Shots against; GA = Goals against; GAA = Goals against average; Sv% = Save percentage; SO = ShutoutsSource:

Tournament awards
Best players selected by the directorate:
Best Goaltender:  Viktor Fasth
Best Defenceman:  Staffan Kronwall
Best Forward:  Alexander Radulov
Top Scorer:  Staffan Kronwall (3 goals, 1 assist)
Most Valuable Player:  Zbyněk Irgl

Tournament All-Star Team selected by the media:
Goaltender:  
Defencemen:  
Forwards:

References

Channel
Channel
Channel
Channel
Channel
Channel One Cup (ice hockey)
International ice hockey competitions hosted by the Czech Republic
December 2011 sports events in Europe
2011 in Moscow